Özlü is a village in Mut district of Mersin Province, Turkey. The population of the village was 245. as of 2012.

References

External links
For images 

Villages in Mut District